Bernard of Valdeiglesias  (or "of Candeleda") was a Benedictine Cistercian monk at Valdeiglesias,  province of Avila, Spain.

Life
Bernard joined the Cistercians in 1177. He was sent with a group of other monks to establish a monastery at Grandassilva in Estremadura, which effort failed when the community was devastated by the plague.

He is Patron saint of Candeleda, Spain, and is invoked against rabies.

Notes

Spanish Roman Catholic saints
12th-century Christian saints
1155 deaths
Spanish Benedictines
Spanish Cistercians
Year of birth unknown